The  is a river that runs through Hiroshima and Shimane prefectures in Japan. It is the largest river in the Chūgoku region. It is also called the Gōgawa River and, in Hiroshima, the Enokawa River.

The mainstream originates from Mount Asa (阿佐山) located in Kitahiroshima, Hiroshima (former Geihoku). The gradients being relatively gentle, the river had been commonly used for boat transport until 1930s, when Sankō Line and trafficways were built and opened.

It is known for ukai (鵜飼い) or cormorant fishing for ayu, which can be found especially in Miyoshi, Hiroshima. According to one theory ukai in Miyoshi has taken place since late Sengoku Period, and is now one of the tourist attractions of the city.

Communities 

The river and its tributaries pass through or borders eight cities and seven towns that are located in Shimane Prefecture and Hiroshima Prefecture as is shown below. As of 2000 according to the national census 278,207 people lived in the drainage basin, including 104,169 from Shimane and 174,038 from Hiroshima.

Hiroshima Prefecture
Kitahiroshima, Akitakata, Higashihiroshima, Sera, Jinsekikogen, Fuchu, Shōbara, Miyoshi
Shimane Prefecture
Ōnan, Misato, Iinan, Kawamoto, Ōda, Hamada, Gōtsu

Dams 

Major dams located within the basin are shown below.

 Haji Dam - located in Akitakata, Hiroshima. Water in the reservoir is supplied to Ōta River that flows into Seto Inland Sea through a tunnel under the dividing ridge.
 Kōbo Dam - located on Kannose River, one of the tributaries, in Takano, Hiroshima.
 Kutsugahara Dam - located on Kannose River in Kimita, Hiroshima.
 Haizuka Dam - located on Jōge River (上下川), one of the tributaries, in Mirasaka, Hiroshima.
 Hamahara Dam - located in Misato, Shimane.

Notes 

 References

External links 
 Chugoku Regional Development Bureau

 
Rivers of Hiroshima Prefecture
Rivers of Shimane Prefecture
Rivers of Japan